Norman Revival architecture is an architectural style.

In the United Kingdom, "Norman style", also known as "Lombard style" may be essentially a synonym for Romanesque Revival architecture.

In the United States, Romanesque Revival architecture evolved differently.  Notable was the divergence of Richardsonian Romanesque architecture as an important subtype.  Norman Revival, likewise, means a somewhat different styling than traditional Romanesque Revival.

The Melrose Arms is one example in Los Angeles.

"Norman" is a term used in conjunction with the style that emerged from the Pacific Northwest Region of the United States Forest Service;  this style "had no clearly identifiable architectural prototype, but reflected the influence of the English Cottage and Norman Farmhouse styles."

See also
 Norman architecture
 Lombard architecture

References

Architectural styles